Hoffer Creek is a tributary of the Susquehanna River in Snyder County, Pennsylvania, in the United States. At least part of the creek is designated as an impaired waterbody due to sedimentation/siltation from grazing-related agriculture. The creek is in the ridge and valley physiographic province, and the geology consists mostly of intermedded sedimentary rock and sandstone.

The main land use in the watershed of Hoffer Creek is agricultural land. However, forested land is also common and there is some low-intensity development. The creek's drainage basin is designated as a Warmwater Fishery and a Migratory Fishery. The creek has few or no riparian buffers in agricultural areas.

Course
Hoffer Creek begins in a small pond in a valley in Chapman Township. It flows east-southeast for a few tenths of a mile, passing through another pond and receiving an unnamed tributary from the left. The creek then turns south-southeast for several tenths of a mile, receiving two unnamed tributaries from the left, and in between them, one unnamed tributary from the right. It then turns southwest and then south, receiving another unnamed tributary from the right before eventually turning south-southeast for more than a mile. In this reach, it receives an unnamed tributary from the right and its valley eventually becomes much shallower. The creek then turns southwest for several hundred feet before turning south-southeast and receiving an unnamed tributary from the right. Several tenths of a mile further downstream, it receives a very short unnamed tributary from the left before crossing US Route 11/US Route 15 and reaching its confluence with the Susquehanna River.

Tributaries
Hoffer Creek has no named tributaries. However, it does have several unnamed tributaries. Three of these are Unt 17489, Unt 17490, and Unt 17491.

Hydrology and climate
Hoffer Creek is designated as an impaired waterbody. The cause of the impairment is sedimentation/siltation and a probable of the impairment is grazing-related agriculture.

Another  comes annually from transitional land, while  comes from low-intensity development. Forests contribute  of sediment per year.

Geography and geology

Hoffer Creek is in the Ridge and Valley physiographic province.

The surface geology in the watershed of Hoffer Creekincluding an adjacent unnamed tributary to the Susquehanna Riveris dominated by interbedded sedimentary rock, which underlies 70 percent of the watershed. Sandstone occupies another 25 percent of the watershed's area. The remaining 5 percent is split between carbonate rock (4 percent) and conglomerate (1 percent). The geology of the watershed has little influence on the creek's sediment load.

The level of slope in the watershed of Hoffer Creek, combined with the lack of conservation farming practices in the upper reaches of the watershed, causes fast-moving silty runoff to form during precipitation events, degrading the creek and all its tributaries. The dominant hydrologic soil groups in the watershed include C (80 percent) and B (20 percent). Streambank erosion occurs in the creek's watershed.

Watershed
The creek is entirely within the United States Geological Survey quadrangle of Dalmatia. Its mouth is located near Dalmatia.

Forested land occupies 42.9 percent of the creek's watershed and low-intensity development occupies 6.1 percent.

All the streams in the watershed are in Chapman Township, in the southern part of Snyder County.

History
Hoffer Creek was entered into the Geographic Names Information System on August 2, 1979. Its identifier in the Geographic Names Information System is 1177159.

The Pennsylvania Department of Transportation was once issued an Encroachment permit to build and maintain an articulated grout mattress in Hoffer Creek, under a bridge carrying State Route 2002.

In June 2012, the Pennsylvania Department of Environmental Protection invited comments on its proposed total maximum daily load for Hoffer Creek. However, no public comments were received.

Biology
The drainage basin of Hoffer Creek is designated as a Warmwater Fishery and a Migratory Fishery. The designated use for the creek is aquatic life.

In agricultural areas along Hoffer Creek, there are few or no riparian buffers. Additionally, livestock have access to the creek and conservation farming practices are not done in the watershed.

See also
Mahantango Creek (Snyder County), next tributary of the Susquehanna River going downriver
Dalmatia Creek, next tributary of the Susquehanna River going upriver
List of rivers of Pennsylvania

References

Rivers of Snyder County, Pennsylvania
Tributaries of the Susquehanna River
Rivers of Pennsylvania